FC Beltatrez or Futebol Clube Beltatrez is an amateur football club of East Timor based in Oxford, England.

History 
The club was initially founded in Lospalos, within the Lautem District of Timor Leste in 2004. During this time the team played in local competitions within the nation, including within the Campeao Regiao Leste in 2007. The club continued to play within East Timor until 2009.

As of 2012 the club has been reestablished within Oxford, England as a Timorese representative side within the area. In 2018 the team competed within the Oxford Diversity Football League, finishing in 7th place out of the 9 competing teams.

Team 
Current squad as of 2019

Links 
Facebook Page

References 

Football clubs in East Timor
Football
Lautém Municipality